The 14th Central American and Caribbean Games were held in Havana, Cuba from August 7 to August 18, 1982, and included 2,420 athletes from nineteen nations competing in 25 different sports. Some events were held in Santiago de Cuba, Cienfuegos, and the eastern end of the island.

Opening
The torch was carried by María Caridad Colón.

Sports
The Games had twenty four sports.

 (first appearance)

 (first appearance)

 (first appearance)

 (first appearance)

Notable results
The Dominicans best the Cubans in baseball.
A snatch world record was set by Cuban Daniel Núñez.

Medal table

References

External links
Meta  
 

 
Central American and Caribbean Games, 1982
Central American and Caribbean Games
Central American and Caribbean Games
Central American and Caribbean Games, 1982
1982 in Central American sport
1982 in Caribbean sport
Multi-sport events in Cuba
20th century in Havana
August 1982 sports events in North America
Sports competitions in Havana